Easy Money may refer to:

Film
 Easy Money (1917 film), an American drama film directed by Travers Vale
 Easy Money (1922 film), an American film produced by REOL Productions
 Easy Money (1925 film), an American silent film directed by Al Rogell
 Easy Money (1934 film), a British film directed by Redd Davis
 Easy Money (1936 film), an American film directed by Phil Rosen
 Easy Money (1948 film), a British satirical film directed by Bernard Knowles
 Easy Money (1981 film), a Soviet film directed by Yevgeny Matveyev
 Easy Money (1983 film), an American comedy film starring Rodney Dangerfield
 Easy Money (1987 film) (Tong tian da dao), a Hong Kong film starring Michelle Yeoh
 Easy Money (1991 film) (Lao biao fa qian han), a Hong Kong film starring Amy Yip
 Easy Money (1994 film) (Xian guang wei lai quan), a Hong Kong film starring Athena Chu
 Easy Money (2010 film) (Snabba Cash), a Swedish thriller film directed by Daniel Espinosa

Music
 Easy Money, a band that included Toby Keith

Albums
 Easy Money (album), by John Anderson

Songs
 "Easy Money" (Johnny Marr song), 2014
 "Easy Money", by Billy Joel, from the album An Innocent Man
 "Easy Money", by Brad Paisley, from the album Time Well Wasted
 "Easy Money", by Bruce Springsteen, from the album Wrecking Ball
 "Easy Money", by Electric Light Orchestra, from the album Zoom
 "Easy Money", by Foghat, from the album Stone Blue
 "Easy Money", by Karmin, from the album Leo Rising
 "Easy Money", by King Crimson, from the album Larks' Tongues in Aspic
 "Easy Money", by Little River Band, from the album The Net
 "Easy Money", by Lowell George, from the album Thanks, I'll Eat It Here
 "Easy Money", by Nick Cave, from the album Abattoir Blues / The Lyre of Orpheus
 "Easy Money", by REO Speedwagon, from the album Nine Lives
 "Easy Money", by Rickie Lee Jones, from the album Rickie Lee Jones

Other
 Easy Money (board game), by Milton Bradley
 Easy Money (TV series), 2008 U.S. dramedy series on the CW television network
 Easy Money (novel), a novel by Jens Lapidus
 Easy Money Creek, a stream in Alaska
 East Money Information, Chinese company

See also 
 Get-rich-quick scheme
 Make Money Fast